Muncho Lake is a highway services community in northern British Columbia, Canada, located at Mile 462 on Highway 97, the Alaska Highway, within Muncho Lake Provincial Park and on the south end of the lake of the same name.  The community consists almost entirely of travel and tourism-related businesses such as lodging, game outfitting, restaurants, gas stations and fishing outfitting.

Climate

See also
Muncho Pass
Sentinel Range (Canada)

References

Unincorporated settlements in British Columbia
Northern Interior of British Columbia 
Populated places in the Northern Rockies Regional Municipality
Canadian Rockies